Kerem  is a Turkish male given name

Kerem may also refer to:

Kerem (surname)
Kerem a Turkish-language opera by Ahmet Adnan Saygun
Kerem, a component of Hebrew placenames literally meaning "vineyard"

See also